Kevin Devine (born December 19, 1979) is an American songwriter and musician from Staten Island, New York City, who is known for his introspective and political themes. He is a contemporary member of the underground indie rock and indie folk musical scenes, and his influences range from older indie artists such as Neutral Milk Hotel, Elliott Smith and Pavement to more mainstream and well known acts such as Nirvana and Bob Dylan. In 2013, Kevin Devine rejoined his previous band, Miracle of 86, for a series of reunion shows.

History

Beginnings
Kevin Devine grew up in Brooklyn and Staten Island and has spent significant time in Manhattan and Queens. Devine graduated from Fordham University at Lincoln Center in 2001, majoring in journalism and writing for the school newspaper, The Fordham Observer. He first played in the band Delusion, which later changed its name to Miracle of 86 (referring to the 1986 New York Mets). At Fordham he was able to hone his solo, acoustic style by playing at various open-mic and college events. Devine released his first solo album, entitled Circle Gets the Square, in 2002 under the record label Immigrant Sun Records, as well as being produced by Bill Manoudakis. During this time he also appeared in regular stints at the Wetlands Preserve venue in New York City.

His brother, Dan Devine, is a columnist for The Ringer.

Increased success (2002–2007)
Although still relatively unknown, Devine gained some popularity with his 2003 album, Make the Clocks Move. This album's songs reflect Devine's political views and a growing introspective style, inspired by recent death of his father to a stroke. These two styles would become a staple in Devine's music that followed.

It is the first of two albums released on Triple Crown Records. It is also the first of three albums produced by Chris Bracco and Mike Skinner (ex-Miracle of 86). In 2005, Devine released his third full-length album, Split the Country, Split the Street. He signed with Capitol Records, who released his fourth album, Put Your Ghost to Rest, on October 17, 2006. Only four months after his major label debut, Devine was dropped from Capitol Records due to EMI merging Virgin and Capitol Records.

Devine was able to gather a strong fan base as a result of his exposure through touring with Brand New (who were also formerly signed to Triple Crown Records). First appearing as their opening act on their 2004 spring tour, Devine made a small splash among their fan base; however, opening for them again in April 2006 and joining their 2007 Spring tour with Manchester Orchestra greatly increased his fan base and affected his career. Devine also toured solo with Jesse Lacey of Brand New and singer-songwriter Grace Read.

Brother's Blood and Bad Books (2008–2010)
After negotiations with Capitol Records, Put Your Ghost To Rest was re-released on April 20, 2008, by Procrastinate! Music Traitors. Several new demos were featured on Devine's MySpace page around this time. A majority of the demos would later be properly featured on Brother's Blood and a single for "Another Bag of Bones" was released in August 2008. The tours throughout 2008 were in support of both the Put Your Ghost To Rest re-release and his new material.

In December 2008, Devine announced in an interview with Popwreckoning that his new album Brother's Blood would be released on April 28 on Favorite Gentlemen records. He also announced a tour with Manchester Orchestra and the release of the I Could Be With Anyone EP in support of the upcoming album.

He toured extensively in 2009–2010 for Brother's Blood, including dates with Manchester Orchestra, Brand New, Thrice, and Nada Surf. He also played a number of major music festivals, including Coachella, Lollapalooza, The Bamboozle and Bonnaroo. On July 6, 2010, Devine released the She Stayed As Steam EP, featuring outtakes from Brother's Blood.

In an interview with Manchester Orchestra's Andy Hull, Hull confirmed that Manchester Orchestra and Kevin Devine would be releasing a split EP entitled "I Could Be The Only One". He later confirmed in a January 2010 interview with AbsolutePunk that Manchester Orchestra and Devine had finished a currently untitled album featuring eight songs, with four songs written by Devine and the other four written by Hull. The album was to be released under the band name Bad Books. In August 2010, the band officially announced their self-titled debut album Bad Books would be released on October 19, 2010.  A 4-date east coast tour in support of the album was also announced. Another short acoustic tour followed in December 2010, with only Kevin Devine and Manchester Orchestra frontman Andy Hull playing Bad Books songs, as well as solo songs.

Between the Concrete and Clouds (2010–2012)
On August 26, 2010, Devine announced on his Facebook page that he had begun writing his sixth album. A post made on his Facebook page also revealed tentative song titles which included "Between the concrete & clouds," "The first hit," "Off-screen," "A story, a sneak," "The city has left you," "11–17," "I used to be someone," "Sleepwalking through my life," "Wait out the wreck," and "Merry Levov". (The song "Merry Levov" was possibly renamed "Awake in the dirt", as it does not appear on the album yet would explain the lyrical content of the later renaming.) Several rough draft lyrics of these songs were added to his Facebook notes page. Recording was completed on March 6, 2011. Between the Concrete and the Clouds is the first record made by Devine that is fully backed by a band, featuring musicians Brian Bonz (keyboard), Chris Bracco (a.k.a. Plosive) (bass, keyboard), Mike Fadem (drums, percussion), Russell Smith (electric guitar), and Mike Strandberg (guitar, mandolin). It was recorded in 10 days over a span of a month, produced by longtime collaborator Chris Bracco and mixed by Rob Schnapf.

In March 2011 Devine toured with River City Extension, and released a split 7-inch EP. Devine's songs on the EP are an acoustic version of "Between the Concrete and Clouds" and "Walls", a Tom Petty cover.

Two 7-inch singles, "Luxembourg" and "Part of the Whole", were released on May 17, with the album Between the Concrete and Clouds to follow later in the year.

During an Alt Press interview on July 6, 2011, Between The Concrete and the Clouds was officially announced for a September 13, 2011, release in the US on Razor & Tie/Favorite Gentlemen Records. He performed some of his new material on tour starting in spring 2010. A few songs on the album (most notably "Awake in the Dirt") are influenced by the book American Pastoral by Phillip Roth.

In honor of the 20th anniversary of Nirvana's classic album Nevermind, Kevin Devine covered the entire album, and let fans download it on his website for free.

Bubblegum, Bulldozer, Devinyl Splits, and Matter of Time (2012–2016)
On January 14, 2013, Devine launched a Kickstarter campaign to help fund his next two albums. Later that day, it was announced the entire goal amount was raised, and on February 28, when the project finished being funded, fans of Kevin Devine had pledged $114,805 (USD). Both albums were released in the United States on October 15, 2013, via Devinyl Records/Favorite Gentlemen/Procrastinate! Music Traitors labels. His seventh studio album, Bulldozer, is a solo album, with Rob Schnapf as collaborator and producer of the album. His eighth studio album, Bubblegum, made with the contribution of his backing band The Goddamn Band, was produced by Jesse Lacey of Brand New.

On January 27, 2015, Devine announced Devinyl Splits, a six-part split series featuring artists such as Matthew Caws, Meridith Graves of Perfect Pussy, and Tigers Jaw to be released on Bad Timing Records. Devinyl Splits No. 1: Matthew Caws x Kevin Devine was released on February 24, 2015, with the remaining five splits released every other month in April, June, August, October, and December.

Matter of Time was released on October 19, 2015, described as, "...a mix between a compilation and live album. The album was recorded by Devine and The Goddamn Band in a 2012 studio session fresh off of extensive touring."

Instigator, We Are Who We've Always Been, Social Club, and Matter of Time II (2016–2021)
On January 29, 2016, Devine announced that his ninth LP was completed and mastered, to be released on Procrastinate! Music Traitors. On August 8, 2016, Devine announced that his ninth studio album would be called Instigator and that it would be out in the fall. He also announced a fall 2016 US tour with Julien Baker, Pinegrove and Petal to support the record.

On September 13, 2017, Devine announced that he would be joining Brand New as a touring member, playing guitar and singing harmonies for the foreseeable future. He departed after sexual misconduct allegations were raised against Lacey.

On October 20, 2017, Devine released We Are Who We've Always Been, an acoustic version of his 2016 album Instigator.

Devine opened for The Get Up Kids on the first leg of their Fall 2019 tour.

Devine launched a Patreon titled the "Social Club" on April 2, 2020. Three initial tiers were offered, with monthly and annual perks varying by tier, including a cover song, reimagined or new original song, monthly video updates, private concerts on Instagram, sticker sheets, pins, and handwritten lyrics. To kick off the second year of the Social Club, new perks were announced on April 5, 2021.

Tenth anniversary concerts for Brother's Blood and Between the Concrete and Clouds were held in December 2019 and November 2021, respectively. A deluxe edition of Between the Concrete and Clouds was digitally released on October 22, 2021.

Matter of Time II was released on September 19, 2021, recorded in February of the same year. The pre-order included a vinyl option, along with a repressing of the first Matter of Time on vinyl. Devine shared, "We never anticipated the first [Matter of Time] would grow to hold the high place it does in the estimation of so many of you; we hope this one earns its keep and slots neatly at its side."

Nothing's Real, So Nothing's Wrong (2022-present)
On January 11, 2022, Devine announced his tenth LP, Nothing's Real, So Nothing's Wrong, would be released on March 25, 2022, on Triple Crown Records. The announcement included a pre-order and a release of the album's first single, "Albatross". Devine began a  25-date, U.S. tour on April 6, 2022, and scheduled to last through May 20, 2022, in support of the new album. Opening acts include Kississippi, Pronoun, and Kayleigh Goldsworthy.

Discography

Albums
2002: Circle Gets the Square
2003: Make the Clocks Move
2005: Split the Country, Split the Street
2006: Put Your Ghost to Rest
2009: Brother's Blood
2011: Between the Concrete and Clouds
 2013: Bulldozer
 2013: Bubblegum
 2016: Instigator
 2022: Nothing's Real, So Nothing's Wrong

Cover, Reimagined, and Compilation albums
2011: Nevermind (Nirvana cover album)
2017: We Are Who We've Always Been (Reimagined and acoustic version of Instigator)
2021: Out In The Ether (cover songs and reimagined original recordings from first year on Patreon, 18 songs on vinyl/10 songs on digital)
2022: Out In The Ether (2021) (cover songs from second year on Patreon, 12 songs on vinyl)

Live albums
2005: Live at Schubas May 13, 2005 (Digital only)
2006: Live at Maxwell's August 2, 2006 (Digital only)
2007: Live at Austin City Limits Music Festival 2007: Kevin Devine (Digital only)
2009: Kevin Devine: Live at Looney Tunes 4.16.09
2012: Matter of Time: KD&GDB Tour EP 2012 (Digital only/2015 Vinyl Release)
2015: Matter of Time
2016: Live At St. Pancras Old Church
2020: Daytrotter Sessions: 2008-2015
2021: Matter of Time II

EPs
2003: Travelling the EU
2006: Buried by the Buzzzz
2007: 2007 Tour EP
2008: The Schnapf Singles
2008: I Could Be with Anyone
2010: I Could Be the Only One (split with Manchester Orchestra)
2010: She Stayed As Steam
2011: Kevin Devine/River City Extension Split
2020: Kenny O'Brien & The O'Douls
2020: No One's Waiting up for Me Tonight (First released as digital only, later released in June 2021 on vinyl)
2021: Out In The Ether Singles (Digital only)

Devinyl Splits Series
(7-inch/digital)
2015: No. 1 Matthew Caws x Kevin Devine
2015: No 2. Meredith Graves x Kevin Devine
2015: No 3. Tigers Jaw x Kevin Devine
2015: No 4. Cymbals Eat Guitars x Kevin Devine
2015: No 5. Owen x Kevin Devine
2016: No 6. Jesse Lacey x Kevin Devine
2018: No 7. Craig Finn x Kevin Devine
2018: No 8. David Bazan x Kevin Devine
2018: Unplanned Service Changes Worriers x Kevin Devine
2018: No 9. Petal x Kevin Devine
2018: No 10. John K. Samson x Kevin Devine
2019: No 11. Cavetown x Kevin Devine
2019: No 12. The Front Bottoms x Kevin Devine

From The Vault & Archival Recording Patreon Series
2020: Travelling the EU: 2003 (Rerelease, digital only)
2021: Live From Pianos: 2004 (Digital only)
2021: Bowery Ballroom: April 2004 (Digital only)
2021: Live at The Electric Factory: April 25, 2007 (Digital only)
2021: Live at The Northstar Bar: December 7, 2008 (Digital only)

Singles
2007: "Just Stay2008: "Another Bag of Bones"
2009: "Splitting Up Christmas"
2011: "Part of the Whole" (7-inch/digital)
2011: "Luxembourg" (7-inch/digital)
2014: "She Can See Me" (7-inch/digital)

Remixes
2014: "Red Bird (Sombear Remix)"

Music videos
2006: "Brooklyn Boy" (directed by Paxen Films)
2006: "Me and My Friends" (directed by Paxen Films)
2009: "I Could Be with Anyone" (directed by Sherng-Lee Huang)
2009: "Another Bag of Bones"
2011: "Off-Screen"
2013: "Bubblegum" (directed by Daniel Ralston)
2014: "Little Bulldozer" (directed by Jay Miller)
2014: "She Can See Me"

with Miracle of 86
1995: Stages (EP under the band name Delusion)
1996: Teenage Unity (EP under the band name Delusion)
1998: Render Useless/Miracle of 86 (Split with Render Useless)
2000: Miracle of 86 (Fade Away)2001: Kevin Kolankowski2003: Every Famous Last Word2005: Last Gasp (EP)

with Bad Books
2010: Bad Books2012: Bad Books II2013: Daytrotter Session (12-inch/digital)
2019: Bad Books III''

References

External links

Kevin Devine's MySpace
Brooklyn Boy music video on YouTube
Academy Fight Song's MySpace
These Are Not Records official website
Kevin Devine Interview Regarding His Career on Audioholic Media
Kevin Devine Interview Regarding Being Dropped By Capitol Records
Kevin Devine Debuts 'Another Bag of Bones' on SPIN.com
Kevin Devine's Popwreckoning Interview Part 1
Kevin Devine interview on Shockhound

American male singer-songwriters
American rock guitarists
American male guitarists
Singer-songwriters from New York (state)
American rock songwriters
American rock singers
Fordham University alumni
Musicians from Brooklyn
Living people
1979 births
American atheists
Triple Crown Records artists
Guitarists from New York (state)
21st-century American singers
21st-century American guitarists
21st-century American male singers
Defiance Records artists
Big Scary Monsters Recording Company artists